Juhani is a fictional character appearing in BioWare's 2003 action role-playing video game Star Wars: Knights of the Old Republic. Within the series, Juhani is a Jedi Knight who is a member of the feline Cathar species. She initially appears as an enemy, but joins the protagonist Revan if she is spared and offered a chance to redeem herself. If the player character is female, Juhani develops romantic feelings for her and the player can pursue a romance. Juhani is notable as the first LGBTQ character in the Star Wars media franchise, specifically a lesbian, as well as BioWare's first gay character. She is voiced by Courtenay Taylor.

Juhani is mostly well received. She has been called one of the best LGBTQ characters in video games and an early example of positive LGBT representation in video games.

Development
The character was originally named Bastila during early development of Knights of the Old Republic, until that name was reassigned to the game's human female Jedi lead character. Juhani's voice actress Courtenay Taylor noted that the character "had this pull of light and dark, good and evil", and said she is drawn to playing characters who have that kind of inner conflict.

Juhani is the first character who is created and written as LGBTQ in the Star Wars franchise, as well as the franchise's first lesbian character. Female player characters have the option of a romance with Juhani; she develops romantic feelings that the player can choose to reciprocate or discourage. A portion of the content related to her romance arc was cut from the game before release, although the unused dialogue files still exist in the game. 

In the initial release of the game, a bug allowed the character to voice one line of romantic dialogue to both male and female player characters, leading to players as well as the official Databank entry for the character initially identifying her as bisexual. BioWare later released a patch which corrected Juhani's romance arc and restricted it for female player characters only.

Character
Juhani is a member of the Cathar species, known for their courage in battle, their fierce loyalty and their quick tempers. She is originally from Taris, but left at some point to become a Jedi. Her in-game dialogue highlights the inequality and discrimination faced by characters from financially disadvantaged or ethnically diverse backgrounds in the Star Wars Universe. This is informed by her background as an individual of lower socioeconomic status in Taris, as many of her fellow citizens face crushing poverty, taxes from the corrupt government, extortion from local criminals, and if they are non-human, bigotry and hate from the more affluent and human citizens. She is characterized as being locked in a constant struggle to find a balance between her instincts and her training, which makes it difficult for her to follow Jedi teachings without strict discipline. She is depicted as a perfectionist who does not easily accept failure in herself or in others, who devotes herself fully to the Jedi Code, and is determined to master both her volatile emotions and her ability in the Force. She is capable of camouflaging and concealing herself with the power of the Force as a unique innate talent.

Appearances

In Knights of the Old Republic
Juhani first appears in the 2003 role-playing video game Star Wars: Knights of the Old Republic. As part of her backstory, Juhani accidentally struck her master Quatra during a lightsaber training duel after she lost control of her anger. Filled with fear and guilt at the apparent demise of Quatra, who had feigned death in order to test Juhani but underestimated the intensity of her instincts, she fell to the dark side and fled; she believed that after what she did the Jedi Council would not accept her back and that the dark side held greater power. She secludes herself in a grove on the planet Dantooine, where her inner emotional turmoil creates a disturbance in the Force, agitating nearby wildlife and casting a gloomy pall within the surrounding area. Juhani's fate is dependent on the player's choice as Revan during their initial encounter where Juhani initiates the attack. If Juhani is spared, she will attempt to atone for her momentary lapse of judgment and joins the player's party. A female player character has the option to pursue a romantic relationship with her; outside of the gameplay options, Revan is male and romantically linked to Bastila Shan within established Star Wars Legends continuity. If Juhani is slain, a female Jedi non-player character, Belaya, will be angered by the turn of events and leaves the Jedi Order; it is implied that Belaya is or was previously in a relationship with Juhani. Belaya later reappears as a fallen Dark Jedi and attacks Revan's party out of vengeance.

Beyond her character-specific side-quest involving revenge on a slave trader who murdered her parents, Juhani does not play a significant role in the game's narrative following her recruitment, though she will turn on Revan along with fellow party member Jolee Bindo if the player chooses to re-embrace their character's original position as the Dark Lord of the Sith later in the game.

Later appearances
While she is shown as a hologram within one scene in Star Wars: The Old Republic and has been mentioned in a few instances, Juhani makes no further appearances in the series. Juhani is mentioned in several Star Wars reference books, such as Jedi vs. Sith: The Essential Guide to the Force and the second volume of The Complete Star Wars Encyclopedia. Wizards of the Coast created a miniature for the character, along with other characters in the Knights of the Old Republic series, which was released August 19, 2008.

Juhani is available as a playable character for the mobile game Star Wars: Galaxy of Heroes.

Reception
Juhani has received mostly positive reception for her appearance in Star Wars: Knights of the Old Republic. In an article written for Vulture Hound, Thomas Richard considered Juhani to be a conceptually interesting character. He praised Taylor's subtle performance, noting that Taylor "delivers her lines with a purring Russian accent and a deliberate pace that, all while presenting some perceptible differences with what the listener may be accustomed to hearing from real people, enable her to track down her character’s conflicted emotions with remarkable precision". He opined that she successfully conveyed the character's "struggle to understand and control the anger in her heart, the resentment, self-blame and internalized sense of inadequacy caused by years of racial injustice" exactly when she needs to. Rostislav Kurka from Sci Fi Fantasy Network was of the view that Juhani's redemption was affirming and resonated with players who struggle with identity issues and the belief that "they were not “right” according to the standards of their society". Conversely, Robert Purchese from Eurogamer commented that Juhani's story arc was relatively unexplored and her romance subplot was not up to BioWare's usual standards. He remarked that while she did open up to Revan about her feelings, "the final battle commences and there's never time to find out what happens next". UGO Networks considered Juhani to be one of the worst Star Wars Expanded Universe characters, arguing that Juhani's only saving grace is her potential romantic subplot, whereas she is a bland and pointless character who is supposedly underpowered compared to other Jedi party members and is "almost a non-entity in the story".

Juhani has received particular attention for her status as an LGBT character. The character is often brought up in discussions about the history of LGBT representation and portrayal of queer characters in the Star Wars universe. She was also the first gay character in a video game produced by BioWare. David Silver, guest writing for VentureBeat, remarked that characters like Juhani are an example of the positive influence of LGBT video game characters, as they promote understanding and represent the real life LGBT community in a strong and positive light. Kurka consider Juhani to be an important LGBTQ protagonist, stressing that her appearance was remarkable in terms of the entire gaming industry, as there had not been many LGBTQ characters in mainstream video games at that time. Complex ranked Juhani as the second coolest LGBT video game characters, and opined that her importance should inspire some "nerdcore rap lyric about her". The Advocate ranked Knights of the Old Republic sixth on their list of notable video games with queer content, citing Juhani's character arc as the reason for the placement. David Gaider said Juhani's appearance in Knights of the Old Republic was a watershed moment which inspired him to write more LGBT-related content and advocate for greater inclusivity in BioWare's later video game projects during his employment with the company.

See also
List of Star Wars: Knights of the Old Republic characters
Media portrayal of lesbianism

References

External links

BioWare characters
Extraterrestrial characters in video games
Female characters in video games
Fictional bisexual females
Fictional lesbians
Fictional swordfighters in video games
LGBT characters in video games
Star Wars Jedi characters
Star Wars Legends characters
Star Wars video game characters
Video game bosses
Video game characters introduced in 2003
Video game characters who can move at superhuman speeds
Video game sidekicks
Woman soldier and warrior characters in video games
Fictional characters who can turn invisible
Fictional characters with extrasensory perception
Star Wars: Knights of the Old Republic characters